homeMADE is an Australian reality television series that aired on the Nine Network. It premiered on 10 May 2009, and episodes aired twice weekly on Tuesdays at 7:30 pm and again at 9:30 pm. The series was presented by David Heimann, who also acted as a mentor to the contestants.

The concept of homeMADE was that two teams of emerging designers renovated two houses in five days, with one eventual winner receiving a prize of $100,000. The winner was announced on 7 July, as Jason from NSW. The designers were judged by Neale Whitaker, Editor-in-Chief of Belle, and interior stylist Sibella Court. Whitaker and Court are joined by guest judges, including Deborah Bibby, Paul Hecker, David Hicks and Greg Natale.

Contestants

Episode ratings
 Colour key:
  – Highest rating during the series
  – Lowest rating during the series

References

Nine Network original programming
2000s Australian reality television series
2009 Australian television series debuts
2009 Australian television series endings